The 1999 Croatian Bol Ladies Open singles was the singles event of the sixth edition of the Croatian Bol Ladies Open, a WTA Tier IV tournament and the most prestigious women's tennis tournament held in Croatia. Mirjana Lučić was the two-time defending champion, but she did not compete this year.

Corina Morariu won the title after losing in the final the previous two years, defeating first seed Julie Halard-Decugis.

Seeds

Draw

Finals

Top half

Bottom half

Qualifying

Seeds

Qualifiers

Lucky losers
  Amanda Grahame

Qualifying draw

First qualifier

Second qualifier

Third qualifier

Fourth qualifier

External links
 1999 Croatian Bol Ladies Open Draw

Croatian Bol Ladies Open
Croatian Bol Ladies Open